Werder (Havel) station is a railway station in Werder (Havel), Brandenburg, Germany.

References

Railway stations in Brandenburg
Buildings and structures in Potsdam-Mittelmark